Sham Shek Tsuen is a village on Lantau Island, Hong Kong.

Sham Shek Tsuen is located along Tung O Ancient Trail.

External links

 Delineation of area of existing village Sham Shek (Tai O) for election of resident representative (2019 to 2022)

Lantau Island
Villages in Islands District, Hong Kong